Gymnoclytia is a genus of flies in the family Tachinidae.

Species
G. dubia (West, 1925)
G. ferruginea Townsend, 1934
G. ferruginosa (Wulp, 1892)
G. griseonigra (Wulp, 1892)
G. hirticollis (Wulp, 1892)
G. immaculata (Macquart, 1844)
G. melanosoma (Wulp, 1892)
G. minuta Brooks, 1946
G. occidentalis Townsend, 1908
G. occidua (Walker, 1849)
G. paulista Townsend, 1929
G. propinqua (Wulp, 1892)
G. subpetiolata (Wulp, 1892)
G. unicolor (Brooks, 1946)
G. variegata (Wulp, 1892)

References

Phasiinae
Diptera of North America
Tachinidae genera
Taxa named by Friedrich Moritz Brauer
Taxa named by Julius von Bergenstamm